Phoxinus strymonicus is a species of minnow that was described in 2007 from Greece and Bulgaria. This small fish inhabits streams with clear and cool waters often with dense vegetation; these water bodies usually depend on cold-water springs. It reaches 6 cm TL.

References

strymonicus
Taxa named by Maurice Kottelat
Fish described in 2007